Rolando Medina, commonly known as Lan Medina (born December 22, 1961), is a Filipino comic book artist best known for his work on Fables, Aria, District X, and The Punisher: MAX imprint.

Awards 
In the 2007 Glyph Comics Awards, the Fan Award for Best Comic was won by Storm, by Eric Jerome Dickey, David Yardin & Lan Medina, and Jay Leisten & Sean Parsons.

Selected bibliography
American Century

References

External links

 The Punisher One - deviantART

Living people
Filipino comics artists
Filipino artists
1961 births